Qiao Bin (born 17 November 1992) is a  Chinese badminton player. He won his first senior international title at the China International tournament. In 2016, Qiao who ranked 41 at that time clinched the Superseries title at the Korea Open, defeated the sixth seed, world number eight, Son Wan-ho in the final.

Achievements

BWF Superseries 
The BWF Superseries, launched on 14 December 2006 and implemented in 2007, is a series of elite badminton tournaments, sanctioned by Badminton World Federation (BWF). BWF Superseries has two level such as Superseries and Superseries Premier. A season of Superseries features twelve tournaments around the world, which introduced since 2011, with successful players invited to the Superseries Finals held at the year end.

Men's singles

  BWF Superseries Finals tournament
  BWF Superseries Premier tournament
  BWF Superseries tournament

BWF Grand Prix 
The BWF Grand Prix has two level such as Grand Prix and Grand Prix Gold. It is a series of badminton tournaments, sanctioned by Badminton World Federation (BWF) since 2007.

Men's singles

  BWF Grand Prix Gold tournament
  BWF Grand Prix tournament

BWF International Challenge/Series 
Men's singles

  BWF International Challenge tournament
  BWF International Series tournament

References

External links 
 

1992 births
Living people
People from Xiangtan
Badminton players from Hunan
Chinese male badminton players
Badminton players at the 2018 Asian Games
Asian Games gold medalists for China
Asian Games medalists in badminton
Medalists at the 2018 Asian Games
Universiade medalists in badminton
Universiade silver medalists for China
Medalists at the 2015 Summer Universiade